Alexandra is a ghost town in Yavapai County, Arizona, United States. The ghost town was settled during the frontier days of 1875 as a mining camp until abandoned in 1896. Alexandra is ten miles east of Mayer.

History

Alexandra was founded by E.G. Peck, the owner of the Peck Mine, a famous mining company at the time, T.M. Alexander, William Cole and a man named Curtis Coe Bean. One day in June 1875 while walking through the Bradshaw Mountains, Peck noticed a peculiar rock partly underground. After examination, the rock proved to be pure silver and the first of Alexandra was founded. The town is located in Peck Canyon and was named Alexandra after Mrs. T.M. Alexander, a founder and the first lady to be at the town. A long mountain road separated the town from Mayer. The silver ore produced from the mine was taken via pack train through Bradshaws to Aztlan Mill, thirty miles away.

This became troublesome so eventually Peck built his own mill at Alexandra in 1877. A year later a post office was established. The town boomed and grew to seventy-five to 100 buildings. General stores, saloons, boarding houses, livery stables, a blacksmith and a brewery all existed there. Alexandra was lively until litigation problems began and by 1879 the town was mostly uninhabited and remained so for years. The post office closed in 1896 but in 1903, a new mine shaft was founded at Peck Mine. This did not save the town though, apparently Alexandra never thrived again and became a ghost.

Alexandra's population was 190 in 1890.

References

External links
Ghosttowns.com entry for Alexandra
Arizona Pioneer & Cemetery Research Project presentation on Alexandra and the Peck Mine

Ghost towns in Arizona
Former populated places in Yavapai County, Arizona
Mining communities in Arizona
1875 establishments in Arizona Territory